Shoreland Lutheran High School (SLHS) is a Lutheran High School in Somers, Wisconsin, affiliated with the Wisconsin Evangelical Lutheran Synod (WELS) and operated by a federation of 24 area congregations.

Description 
SLHS is a private religious high school for grades nine through twelve.

Shoreland Lutheran High School Federation, which operates the school, was organized Feb. 14, 1971. It is a non-profit 501(c)(3) organization.

The Shoreland Lutheran High School Federation also includes Wisconsin Lutheran School, which serves students in grades kindergarten through 8.

History

Early years 
In 1968, "a layman a minister and a teacher coordinating committee" studied the possibility of establishing a school for four congregations (Friedens, St. Luke, Bethany, and Mt. Zion) of the Wisconsin Evangelical Lutheran Synod. In July 1971, the synod's Lutheran high school committee chose the name "Shoreland Lutheran High School".

The first classes were offered during the 1971–72 school year in Friedens Evangelical Lutheran Grade School in Kenosha, for 27 tenth grade students. During the second year of operation, the school moved to Mount Zion Evangelical Lutheran Church, where 46 students were enrolled; the enrollment was 78 during the school's third year. By that year, the school was supported by seven congregations: the original four, plus the Lutheran Church of the Abiding Word, in Somers; Immanuel, in Waukesha; and Our Saviour Lutheran Church, in Zion. SLHS officially became a four-year high school in the autumn of 1973, and graduated its first class in May 1974.

Funding a new building 
As early as 1972, the Shoreland High School Foundation initiated "Project S" to raise $500,000 to build a new school building on property donated by Elmer Kirchner.

In February 1975, its rising enrollment caused a move into a block of rooms on the third floor of the east wing of St. Joseph High School. By October 1975, the school had relocated to Friedens Lutheran School, and the Shoreland School Board made plans to raise $1.4 million to build the school's first permanent home. Enrollment in 1975 was 140 students. 

In December 1975, the school's first principal, E. J. Greve, dug the first shovel of dirt in a ground-breaking ceremony for construction of the new school building. The new building was designed to be a  building with room for 350 students. Scheduled to open in 1976, the new school had eight classrooms, science rooms, an arts room, home economics rooms, music rooms, and a gymnasium.

Building expansions 
An addition to the west end and major internal renovations were completed in 1997. 

In April 2014, the Somers Town Board approved the school's plans for a  science wing addition, including three combination science labs and classrooms, a science technology engineering and mathematics classroom, a new mechanical room, and new handicapped accessible restrooms. In September 2014, the school celebrated opening of the new $4.2 million wing, and the start of the inaugural year of the STEM Project Lead the Way program. Students participating in the program are eligible to earn college credits through the Milwaukee School of Engineering (MSOE). 

A final addition of an auxiliary gymnasium and auditorium in the near future will also include renovating the lunch area and office complex.

Academics 
Shoreland offers a variety of courses, including music, art, foreign languages, woods, small engine repair, computer science courses, biomedical courses, engineering couses, and business courses designed to jump start the students for college level business courses. Further, a pre-ministry program for students wishing to become teachers or pastors in the WEKS is available. It has five Advanced Placement classes: AP Biology, AP Calculus, AP Chemistry, AP History, and AP Literature and Composition. Also Honors Spanish and Honors Physics are also offered. In the 2014–15 school year, Shoreland opened a STEM (Science, Technology, Engineering, Math) Academy. Through a partnership with MSOE it offers students transcript credit. Its state accountability report card is available annually.

Activities 
Shoreland offers Honors Band and is accredited by the Wisconsin School Music Association.. Shoreland also offers fine arts programs as described on "Shoreland Fine Arts".
 Concert Choir
 Chamber Choir
 Band
 Orchestra
 Drama
Other co-curricular activities are described on "Shoreland Clubs".
 Forensics
 Robotics Club
 National Honor Society
 Ministry Club
 Student Ambassadors
 Student Council
 Students for Life

Athletics 
Shoreland offers the sports as described in the SLHS Athletic Handbook and the Wisconsin Sports Network.
 Junior varsity, varsity football
 Junior varsity, varsity soccer
 Freshman, junior varsity, varsity boys' and girls' basketball
 Freshman, junior varsity, varsity girls' volleyball
 Junior varsity, varsity softball
 Junior varsity, varsity baseball
 Junior varsity, varsity girls' soccer
 Track and field
 Cross country
 Boys' and girls' golf
 Junior varsity, varsity wrestling
 Cheerleading

References

External links

School Review website

High schools in Kenosha, Wisconsin
Private high schools in Wisconsin
Educational institutions established in 1971
Lutheran schools in Wisconsin
Secondary schools affiliated with the Wisconsin Evangelical Lutheran Synod
1971 establishments in Wisconsin